Adolph Winkler Goodman (July 20, 1915 – July 30, 2004) was an American mathematician who contributed to number theory, graph theory and to the theory of univalent functions: The conjecture on the coefficients of multivalent functions named after him is considered the most interesting challenge in the area after the Bieberbach conjecture, proved by Louis de Branges in 1985.

Life and work 

In 1948, he made a mathematical conjecture on coefficients of -valent functions, first published in his Columbia University dissertation thesis and then in a closely following paper. After the proof of the Bieberbach conjecture by Louis de Branges, this conjecture is considered the most interesting challenge in the field, and he himself and coauthors answered affirmatively to the conjecture for some classes of -valent functions. His researches in the field continued in the paper Univalent functions and nonanalytic curves, published in 1957: in 1968, he published the survey Open problems on univalent and multivalent functions, which eventually led him to write the two-volume book Univalent Functions.

Apart from his research activity, He was actively involved in teaching: he wrote several college and high school textbooks including Analytic Geometry and the Calculus, and the five-volume set Algebra from A to Z.

He retired in 1993, became a Distinguished Professor Emeritus in 1995, and died in 2004.

Selected works

Notes

Biographical references

References

.
.
.
.

Additional sources

20th-century American mathematicians
21st-century American mathematicians
Complex analysts
Mathematical analysts
Number theorists
Graph theorists
1915 births
2004 deaths